Djinba is an Australian Aboriginal Yolŋu language, spoken by the Djinba in eastern Arnhem Land, Northern Territory.

Dialects of the two moieties are (a) Ganalbingu (Ganhalpuyngu) and (b) Mandjalpingu (Manydjalpuyngu).

Speakers of Mandjalpingu include the actor and traditional dancer David Gulpilil.

References

Yolŋu languages